Concepción Province may refer to:

Concepción Province, Chile
Concepción Province, Peru

See also  
Concepción (disambiguation)